Kelly Scott Poppinga (born January 31, 1982) is an American football coach and former player. He is the special teams coordinator and defensive ends coach at the Brigham Young University (BYU). He is the younger brother of National Football League (NFL) linebacker Brady Poppinga.

Playing career
Poppinga played college football at Utah State University and BYU as a linebacker. He was signed by the Miami Dolphins of the NFL as an undrafted free agent in 2008 and also spent time that season with the St. Louis Rams and Arizona Cardinals.

Coaching career
In December 2015, Poppinga was hired by Bronco Mendenhall to follow him to the University of Virginia (UVA) as outside linebackers coach after serving in the same role at BYU under Mendenhall. Following the end of the 2021 season, Poppinga was not retained by the new UVA coaching staff but was hired a short time later at Boise State University. Poppinga was hired on December 7, 2022 back to BYU as a special team coordinator and defensive assistant coach.

References

External links
 BYU profile

1982 births
Living people
American football linebackers
Arizona Cardinals players
BYU Cougars football coaches
BYU Cougars football players
Miami Dolphins players
Utah State Aggies football players
St. Louis Rams players
Virginia Cavaliers football coaches
Boise State Broncos football coaches
People from Evanston, Wyoming
Coaches of American football from Wyoming
Players of American football from Wyoming
American Latter Day Saints